Anadilim Aşk is Işın Karaca's debut album, it was released at 2001 with Power Records label. All the songs are written by Sezen Aksu, except two of them co-written by Ali İlyas and Sezen Aksu. The first video became "Tutunamadım". The second video is shot for "Başka Bahar", which become very successful in music charts of Turkey. After this success in Turkey, the song is chosen to represent Turkey in OGAE in 2002. However, it became the last without getting any points in the contest. The third video is shot for "Aramıza Yollar" by Lebanese director Waleed Nassif. This video is the first video in High Definition format in Turkey. Famous Turkish actor Toprak Sergen also starred in the video. The fourth video is shot for "Doğum Günün Kutlu Olsun Oğlum", but it was not aired due to conflicts with her company. The album sold-out quickly and released second time with addition of "Tutunamadım Remix". In 2006, the album re-released with SM Gold label.

Album history
Işın Karaca worked for about seven years as back vocalist of Sezen Aksu. Sezen Aksu, a famous Turkish star, wanted to help her with her debut album, so the album is entirely produced by Aksu.

In the song "Lamba", piano is performed by Onno Tunç, a famous musician who died in a plane crash in 1996. The piano samples were originally performed in Zuhal Olcay's song "Kod Adım Leyla" in her Oyuncu album in 1996. The piano compositions are cleaned from the song and then added to "Lamba". The reason for that is; Sezen Aksu and Onno Tunç worked together and made very successful works in Turkey. Işın never met Onno Tunç, because Onno died just before Işın and Sezen met. So she missed the chance of working with Onno. And this become one of her wishes which was impossible after Onno's death. Aksu, who knows Işın's dream, ordered to clean the piano samples. The song was then arranged by Ayda Tunç, daughter of Onno. It was a surprise for Işın, because, Aksu didn't tell this to her unless the song was finished.

The song "Doğum Günün Kutlu Olsun Oğlum" was written by Sezen Aksu in Işın's house in mother's day. Sezen Aksu was returned from her visit to Italy. She was touched by the death fasts and then she wrote this song about the incidents.

Track listing

Bonus track (added by the second release)

Credits
Production: Power Records
Producer: Sezen Aksu
Mix: Studio Maslak B
Mastering: Çağlar Türkmen
Photographs: Tamer Yılmaz
Graphic Design: Ultra
Hair: Serpil Yıldız
Make-up: Fatka and Suzan Kardeş

Music videos
Tutunamadım
Başka Bahar
Aramıza Yollar

Song samples

Release history

References

External links

2001 debut albums
Işın Karaca albums